Tibor Zsíros (30 June 1930 – 13 February 2013) was a Hungarian basketball player who competed in the 1948 Summer Olympics, the 1952 Summer Olympics and the 1960 Summer Olympics.

A native of Budapest, Zsíros was a member of the Hungarian team, which finished sixteenth in the 1948 tournament. Four years later he was part of the Hungarian basketball team, which was eliminated after the group stage in the 1952 tournament. He played in all six matches.

References

External links 
basketpedya.com
 Elhunyt Zsíros Tibor 

1930 births
2013 deaths
Hungarian men's basketball players
Olympic basketball players of Hungary
Basketball players at the 1948 Summer Olympics
Basketball players at the 1952 Summer Olympics
Basketball players at the 1960 Summer Olympics
FIBA EuroBasket-winning players
Basketball players from Budapest